Jan Güntner (born 17 June 1931) is a Polish stage and film actor and director.

Biography 
He graduated from the State College of Acting in Kraków in 1953. Since the beginning of Piwnica pod Baranami activity in 1958 he was a regular participant of the cabaret, he was the first to declaim poems by his friend Andrzej Bursa on the stage.

Güntner made his first steps in acting at Teatr Młodego Widza (the Young Viewer Theatre) led by Maria Biliżanka. He was an actor of Ludowy Theatre (1958–1971), National Stary Theatre (1972–1973; 1982–2000; guest starring 2005) and Bagatela Theatre (1976–1982).

In 2000 he was awarded by the President of Poland with an Officer's Cross of the Order of Polonia Restituta.

References

Living people
1931 births
Polish male stage actors
Polish male film actors
Male actors from Kraków
Officers of the Order of Polonia Restituta